Łętowo may refer to the following places:
Łętowo, Masovian Voivodeship (east-central Poland)
Łętowo, Pomeranian Voivodeship (north Poland)
Łętowo, Warmian-Masurian Voivodeship (north Poland)
Łętowo, West Pomeranian Voivodeship (northwest Poland)